Juozas Bernatonis (born 8 September 1953 in Kaunas) is a Lithuanian jurist and politician,  Minister of Justice and member of Seimas (1992-2004).

Education 
In 1976 graduated from Kaunas Polytechnic Institute, Faculty of Chemical Technology.
In 1990 graduated from a postgraduate programme in philosophy in Prague and defended his doctor’s thesis.
In 2002 graduated from Vilnius University and was awarded a master's degree in Law.

From 1992 to 2004 – member of the Seimas.
From 2001 to 2003 – Minister of the Interior of the Government led by Prime Minister Algirdas Brazauskas. From 2006 to 2012 – Ambassador Extraordinary and Plenipotentiary of Lithuania to the Estonia. 
From  13 December 2012 is he the Minister of Justice of the 16th Government from Algirdas Butkevičius.

From 1990 – member, Vice-Chairman of the Lithuanian Social Democratic Party.

External links 
CV

1953 births
Politicians from Kaunas
Ministers of Internal Affairs of Lithuania
Ministers of Justice of Lithuania
Ambassadors of Lithuania to Estonia
Living people
Social Democratic Party of Lithuania politicians
Members of the Seimas
21st-century Lithuanian politicians
Recipients of the Order of the Cross of Terra Mariana, 2nd Class